The Palazzina di caccia of Stupinigi (Italian: "The hunting residence of Stupinigi") is one of the Residences of the Royal House of Savoy in northern Italy, part of the UNESCO World Heritage Sites list.

History
The original castle was owned by the Acaja line of the House of Savoy, Lords of Piedmont until 1418, and was sold to marquis Rolando Pallavicino in 1493. It was then acquired by Emmanuel Philibert in 1563, when the ducal capital was moved from Chambéry to Turin.

The new palace was designed by the architect Filippo Juvarra to be used as a palazzina di caccia ("hunting lodge") for Victor Amadeus II, King of Sardinia. Works started in 1729. Within two years construction was far enough advanced for the first formal hunt to take place.

Juvarra called upon a team of decorators, many of them from Venice, to carry out the decor of the palazzina interiors. In the reigns of Carlo Emanuele III and  Victor Amadeus III the palazzina and its formal park continued to be extended, at first by Juvarra's assistant, Giovanni Tommaso Prunotto, then by numerous North Italian architects, such as Ignazio Birago di Borgaro, Ludovico Bo, Ignazio Bertola and Benedetto Alfieri. The final building has a total of 137 rooms and 17 galleries, and covers 31,050 square meters. Polissena of Hesse-Rotenburg, wife of Carlo Emanuele III also carried out improvements.

The original purpose of the hunting lodge is symbolized by the bronze stag perched at the apex of the stepped roof of its central dome, and the hounds' heads that decorate the vases on the roofline. The building has a saltire plan: four angled wings project from the oval-shaped main hall.

The extensions resulted in separate pavilions linked by long angled galleries and a long octagonal forecourt enclosed by wings, extended forwards in two further entrance courts.

Stupinigi was the preferred building to be used for celebrations and dynastic weddings by members of the House of Savoy. Here, in 1773, Maria Teresa, Princess of Savoy, married Charles Philippe, Count of Artois, brother of Louis XVI and the future Charles X of France.

Today the Palace of Stupinigi houses the Museo di Arte e Ammobiliamento, a museum of the arts and furnishings, some original to the palazzina, others brought from the former Savoia residences of Moncalieri and Venaria Reale. Stupinigi has the most important collection of Piedmontese furniture, including works by Turin's three most famous Royal cabinet-makers, Giuseppe Maria Bonzanigo, Pietro Piffetti and Luigi Prinotti. Some of the sculptures of hunting figures are by Giovanni Battista Bernero. Additionally, temporary exhibitions are held in its galleries, such as the Mostra del Barocco (1963).

Anna Caterina Gilli was active as a decorative painter at the palace.

Description
The plan of the building is defined by the four arms of St. Andrew's Cross, divided by the central axis that is aligned with the path that leads from Turin to the palace through a tree-lined avenue that runs alongside farms and stables and other old dependencies of the building.

The core nucleus consists of a large central oval hall from which the four wings depart, which the royal apartments and those for guests. The large double-height oval hall with balconies concave-convex, is covered by dome surmounted by the statue of the "Cervo", by Francesco Ladatte. With the departure of Juvarra from Turin, the Prince Charles Emmanuel III entrusted the direction of the work to Giovanni Tommaso Prunotto, who provided for the expansion of the building starting from the sketches left by Juvarra, thus trying to safeguard the complex play of lights and shapes.  The interior is in Italian Rococo, made of precious materials such as lacquers, porcelains, gilded stuccos, mirrors and roots that today extend on an area of about 31,000 square meters, while 14,000 are occupied by adjacent buildings, 150,000 by the park and 3,800 by the external flowerbeds; Overall, there are 137 rooms and 17 galleries. Among the fine furniture made for the building should be mentioned those of the carver Giuseppe Maria Bonzanigo, Pietro Piffetti and Luigi Prinotto. The building preserves decorations by the Venetian painters Giuseppe and Domenico Valeriani, by Gaetano Perego, and by the Viennese Christan Wehrlin. The frescoes by Vittorio Amedeo Cignaroli, Gian Battista Crosato and Carlo Andrea Van Loo are also noteworthy.

Entrance 
The entrance to the complex gives access to the vast area of the Galleria dei Ritratti (Portrait Gallery) which was part of the side stables designed and built by Filippo Juvarra after the completion of the central complex of the building. This space was therefore used for the carriages and coaches and to house horses during the hunts. Here today stands the original statue of Stupinigi's deer created by Francesco Ladatte in 1766 which overlooked the dome of the central hall. It was placed in this room in 1992 and the top of the dome was replaced with a modern bronze copy. The sculpture is surrounded by carved wooden bas-relief portraits commissioned by Vittorio Emanuele II and originally intended for the Moncalieri Castle. In the first library and then in the second library one can find the change of taste in the mid-eighteenth century when the stables area was reduced to make room for a library sandwiched with shelves designed by Benedetto Alfieri and painted in  blue, ivory and gold, accompanied by allegories of the arts and sciences painted by Giuseppe Nogari.

Apartment of the Duke of Chiablese 

Also called "Appartamento di Levante" (as opposed to the specular Appartamento di Ponente), the set of rooms was enlarged under the direction of Benedetto Alfieri in the 18th century to accommodate the rooms of Benedetto di Savoia, Duke of Chiablese, son of King Carlo Emanuele III.

Gambling hall 
The room of greater consistency for size and style in the apartments of the Duke of Chiablese is undoubtedly the gambling hall, a large space intended for the leisure of the court inserted into a rectangular hall with rounded corners and two large niches on the sides more short. The ceiling, decorated by Giovanni Pietro Pozzo in 1765, incorporates the same exotic and oriental motifs of the walls that play the role of an elegant frame for the game furniture inside the room: a mid-eighteenth century drawing room, a game table Louis XV style with a precious chessboard inlaid with ebony and ivory, as well as a desk with refined ivory figures inlaid from the beginning of the 18th century. Noteworthy are also the chinoiserie and the porcelains present in this environment that are well suited to the exotic decoration of the complex.

Hall of Mirrors and Cabinet of Pauline Bonaparte 
The first room, decorated with a very special rococo style, is decorated with stuccos and mirrors from the walls to the ceiling, idea of Giovanni Pietro Pozzo in 1766 with the help of Michele Antonio Rapous in the realization of the boiserie. The chandelier dating back to the 1940s is more ancient and is decorated with sculptures of wrought iron birds. The Cabinet of Pauline Bonaparte owes its fame to the fact that it was made to equip in current forms by Pauline Bonaparte, Napoleon's sister, during her period of stay at the palace when her husband Camillo Borghese was appointed governor of Piedmont. The room, small in size, contains a beautiful marble bathtub, decorated with bas-reliefs representing the imperial insignia with the Napoleonic eagle.

Central Hall 
The central hall, the core of the building, was the first idea of Juvarra to be completed and the focus around which its entire building complex was developed. The room consists of a large oval-shaped room culminating in a dome enclosed by a vaulted ceiling. The hall was completed in 1730 and on 10 February 1731 the king commissioned to the Bolognese brothers Giuseppe and Domenico Valeriani a large fresco on the vault, depicting the Triumph of Diana, the classic goddess of hunting that appears between the clouds, above a celestial chariot overlooking woods. Around there are also putti with game or wreaths of flowers, flanked by nymphs. At the apex of the four pillars that support the dome of the hall, just below the large fresco, there are four monochromatic medallions representing similar episodes related to the same deity. The works for the realization of such frescoes began already on March 8, ending in 1733. Juvarra imposed a quadrature scheme on the two brothers so as not to ruin his complex overall design.

Frescoes of the upper vault 

After Juvarra left, his idea to place large sculptural groups of dogs and deer in the large windows of the salon was abandoned, so as not to excessively limit the splendid perspective view that is still enjoyed looking outwards. The project was entrusted to Giuseppe Marocco, who envisioned the thirty-six wooden fans (appliques) with deer heads that show off themselves on the walls of the hall. From the same period are the gilded wood inlays of the balustrade of the singers in the upper part of the hall and the paracamels painted by the Lombard Giovanni Crivelli (1733). Also worthy of note are the four marble busts made in 1773 by Giovanni Battista Bernero, which overlook the same number of entrances to the hall and which represent minor divinities linked to hunting and the fields: Ceres, Pomona, Naiad and Napea.

The salon, steeped in its structure and in the decorations characteristic of the eighteenth century, also attracted the attention of several contemporaries who were able to see it personally as the French engraver Charles Nicolas Cochin, who however criticized the superabundance of decorations and excessive eccentricity. Of the same opinion was Joseph Jerome Lalande, who reported how the Juvarra was almost completely focused on the salon, leaving behind all the rest and revealing how it was arranged as the "dream of an architect", too risky for a city palace and only for a sumptuous country residence.

The park

The hunting park that belonged to a branch of the House of Savoia was given to Emmanuel Philibert, Duke of Savoy in 1563, when he moved the capital of the duke from Chambéry to Turin. The garden of the hunting lodge and the surrounding hunting estate are clearly distinguished in Stupinigi: the complex, in fact, is part of a large geometric garden, characterized by a continuous succession of flowerbeds, parterres and avenues. This park, bordered by a wall and intersected by long avenues, was designed by the French gardener Michael Benard in 1740. The hunting park, or estate, was instead constituted by the vast area of almost 1,700 hectares that extended outside the fenced park and which had been expropriated by the Duke Emanuele Filiberto di Savoia in 1563 from the Pallavicini. This area included land and woods included today in the municipalities of Nichelino, Orbassano and Candiolo.

Since 1992, woods and agricultural land surrounding Stupinigi have been preserved as the Parco naturale di Stupinigi. Included in the communal territories of Nichelino, Candiolo and Orbassano, it has an area of  that includes a part of the region's original lowland forest, where visitors can admire some rare plant species no longer widely found elsewhere. Wildlife includes beech martens, weasels, foxes, hazel dormice, European hares, white storks, tree squirrels and others.

See also
 List of Baroque residences

Sources

References

External links
Page at Piemonte on line
 Visiting information
Pages by the Park Authority on Parks.it
Photos

Residences of the Royal House of Savoy
Caccia Stupinigi
Buildings and structures in the Metropolitan City of Turin
Art museums and galleries in Piedmont
Decorative arts museums in Italy
Historic house museums in Italy
Museums in Piedmont
Parks in Piedmont
Houses completed in the 18th century
Rococo architecture in Italy
Filippo Juvarra buildings
18th-century architecture in Italy